Justice Harwood may refer to:

Edgar N. Harwood (1854–1936), associate justice of the Montana Supreme Court
R. Bernard Harwood Jr. (born 1939), associate justice of the Alabama Supreme Court
Robert B. Harwood (1902–1991), associate justice of the Alabama Supreme Court